The year 1905 in archaeology involved some significant events.

Explorations
 August – The Withypool Stone Circle (late Neolithic/early Bronze Age)) on Exmoor, England, is first fully surveyed by Harold St George Gray.
 September – The site of the Roman legionary works depot at Holt, Wales, is identified by fieldwalking.
 Theodore M. Davis officially granted exclusive concession to excavate in the Valley of the Kings in Egypt.

Excavations
 Major project of excavation and restoration at Teotihuacan begun under archeologist Leopoldo Batres.
 First excavations at Deir el-Medina by Ernesto Schiaparelli. Medical Ostraca of Deir el-Medina emerge.
 First scientific survey at Great Zimbabwe begun by David Randall-MacIver.
 George Herbert, 5th Earl of Carnarvon, first excavates in Egypt.

Publications
 G. Baldwin Brown publishes The Care of Ancient Monuments: an account of the legislative and other measures adopted in European countries...
 Francis J. Haverfield publishes "The Romanization of Roman Britain" in Proceedings of the British Academy.
 J. R. Mortimer and Robert Mortimer publish their Forty Years Researches in British and Saxon Burial Mounds of East Yorkshire.
 Thomas Gann publishes first descriptions of Maya site of Lubaantun.

Finds
 Winter 1904–5 – Lion Capital of Asoka, dated to about 250 BCE, discovered at Sarnath by F. O. Oertel.
 Naranjo discovered by Teoberto Maler.
 Caral, the oldest Andean city, discovered.
 Three Roman mosaic pavements are found at Harpham in the East Riding of Yorkshire, England.
 Approximate date – Principia of the Roman fort at Bremetennacum (Ribchester), Lancashire, England, discovered by men working for Miss Greenall.

Events
 Arthur Weigall appointed to replace Howard Carter as Chief Inspector of Antiquities for Upper Egypt.

Births
 January 12 – James Bennett Griffin, American archaeologist (died 1997).
 January 26 – Olga Tufnell, English archaeologist of the Near East (died 1985).
 May 11 – Terence Mitford, Japanese-born British archaeologist of the Near East (died 1978).
 October 31 – W. F. Grimes, Welsh archaeologist (died 1988).

Deaths
 March 3 – Antonio Annetto Caruana, Maltese archaeologist (born 1830).

References

Archaeology
Archaeology
Archaeology by year